Thaites ruminiana, is the only species of the extinct genus, Thaites.  It was described by Samuel Hubbard Scudder in 1875, after discovery in Aix-en-Provence, Southern France.  It is a fossil swallowtail butterfly.

References
Hancock, D.L., 1983. Classification of the Papilionidae (Lepidoptera): a phylogenetic approach. Smithersia 2: 1-48.
Scudder, S.H., 1875. Fossil butterflies. Memoirs of the American Association for the Advancement of Science I: I-XI, 1-99. Salem, Massachusetts.

External links
TOL

†
Fossil Lepidoptera
Fossils of France